Tullis is both a surname and a given name. Notable people with the name include:

 Bobby Tullis (born 1950/51), American politician
 Dan Tullis Jr. (born 1951), American actor
 Edward Lewis Tullis (1917–2005), American Bishop of the United Methodist Church
 Floyd LaMond Tullis (born 1935), American professor of political science
 Garner Handy Tullis (born 1939), American artist
 Jillian A. Tullis (born 1977), American professor of communication studies 
 Julie Tullis (1939–1986), British climber and film-maker
 Walter Tullis (born 1953), American football wide receiver
 Willie James Tullis (born 1958), American football defensive back
 Tullis Onstott (1955–2021), American professor of geosciences

See also 
 Tulli, a surname
 Tullis-Toledano Manor, red clay brick mansion, Biloxi

References